Holostaspella is a genus of mites in the family Macrochelidae. There are about 12 described species in Holostaspella.

Species
These 10 species belong to the genus Holostaspella:

 Holostaspella bidentata Özbek, 2017
 Holostaspella bifoliata Tragrdh, 1952
 Holostaspella exornata Filipponi & Pegazzano, 1967
 Holostaspella katakurai Hartini & Takaku, 2003
 Holostaspella moderata Berlese, 1920
 Holostaspella ornata (Berlese, 1904)
 Holostaspella pentalineatus Krauss, 1970
 Holostaspella scatophila Takaku, 1994
 Holostaspella sklari Bregetova, 1977
 Holostaspella subornata Bregetova & Koroleva, 1960

References

Macrochelidae
Articles created by Qbugbot